Miami Palmetto Senior High School is a public magnet high school located at 7431 S.W. 120th Street in Pinecrest, Florida. Miami Norland Senior High is Miami Palmetto's sister school by original blueprints. The school has been named a Blue Ribbon School of Excellence. Its principal is Victoria Dobbs.

The school serves several areas: Pinecrest, Palmetto Bay, and sections of Kendall, West Perrine and Palmetto Estates.

History

Miami Palmetto was built in 1958. Miami Palmetto had a cost of $1,654,400 (equivalent to $ million in ). The expected enrollment was 1,500.

It serves a culturally and socioeconomically diverse population. Miami Palmetto is the home school for the residents of Pinecrest, Palmetto Bay, West Perrine, and Palmetto Estates.
The school enjoys strong support from the municipal governments of the two primary areas zoned to Palmetto Senior, the Village of Pinecrest and the Village of Palmetto Bay. Both provide noteworthy cash or in-kind donations and have active Educational Advisory Compact agreements that facilitate working with MDCPS. Pinecrest gives $10,000 to the school every year, and Palmetto Bay in 2015 sponsored a community-wide 5K Color Run fundraiser benefit. An active PTSA also contributes substantial resources (funding, programming, volunteer manpower).
Palmetto, for years, was a three-year high school, but after the 1997 addition, it expanded to be a four-year high school.
In the school's history, a few scandals have surfaced, one in which lacrosse players shared racist remarks through a group chat to later be counseled, and an incident where a student stabbed a classmate and her teacher with scissors. Miami Palmetto is currently participating in a pilot program of AP Capstone.

In 2017, Miami-Dade Public Schools began an extensive three phase reconstruction of the school which was originally budgeted to cost $44 million.  The overall remodel includes 120,900 square feet of new construction including a new three-story building to house administrative offices; student services; vocational labs, such as Web Design, drafting and design, health science, and business technology.  The remodel also includes a new art wing, photo studio lab, gymnastics space, dance room, music room, and black box theater; new cafeteria building, technology labs, and an indoor and outdoor dining facility adjacent to a central courtyard.  The new building, which was completed as Phase 1 of the project, opened in January 2020.

School trends

Academics
The diverse curriculum offers a choice of twenty-eight AP courses, and students have the highest pass rate for AP exams in the county. The school's pass rate for AP Chemistry for the 2015 exam was the highest in the State of Florida. Over 50% of students take at least one AP class, and over 50% have a GPA higher than 4.0. Graduates are admitted to a wide variety of the nation's top colleges and universities. Miami Palmetto students score higher on other state and national assessments than other standard (non-magnet) public schools in Miami-Dade County. In addition, as a neighborhood (non-magnet) school, Miami Palmetto serves all student populations. The school's Special Olympics athletes win at state level competitions every year. According to Newsweeks 2001 List of the 1,000 Top U.S. Schools, Miami Palmetto is ranked at 251 in the nation (23rd in the state of Florida). According to the 2007 list, the school is ranked at 72 in the nation. This ranking is based on self-reported statistics, including:

 On-time graduation (91%)
 Graduates immediately enrolling in college (95%)
 Various standardized test scores (45%)
 AP/IB/AICE courses offered per graduate (5%)

Miami Palmetto media
Miami Palmetto has three publications: the newspaper, The Panther, the morning announcements and television production, Panther TVP,  and the yearbook, Palm Echo. They are all managed by student staffs.

Athletics

International championships
 Coed sailing – British Schools Dinghy Racing Association Team Racing Champion (by invitation) – 1994

National championships
 Coed sailing – National High School Dinghy Championship (Mallory Trophy) – champion 1994; runner-up 1997
 Coed sailing – national high school team racing champion (Baker Trophy) – 1994
 Single-handed sailing – national interscholastic sailing association champion (Cressy Trophy) – 1989

Notable alumni

 Jeff Bezos – founder of Amazon.com and Blue Origin
 Ketanji Brown Jackson – U.S. Supreme Court associate justice
 Camila Cabello – Grammy-nominated singer, former member of Fifth Harmony
 Alan Campos – former professional football player, Dallas Cowboys
 Vinnie Chulk – former professional baseball player, Cleveland Indians, San Francisco Giants, and Toronto Blue Jays
 Erik Compton – professional golfer, runner-up at 2014 U.S. Open
 Barry Collier –  basketball coach, Nebraska Cornhuskers men's basketball team</ref>
 Derek Connolly – screenwriter of Safety Not Guaranteed and Jurassic World
 Larry Crawford – four-time Canadian Football League All-Star
 Alex Flinn – author of young adult novels
 Tom Foley – third base coach for the Tampa Bay Rays; former Major League Baseball player
 Robin Fraser – former U.S national soccer team member; MLS player with Los Angeles Galaxy; former head coach of Chivas USA
 Nikki Fried – politician, Florida Commissioner of Agriculture, Chair of the Florida Democratic Party
 Terri Garber – actress, played Ashton Main in miniseries North and South
 Glenn Geffner – radio play-by-play announcer for Miami Marlins
 Dominic L. Pudwill Gorie – astronaut
 Ben Greenman – novelist and journalist, best-selling author of Mo Meta Blues, The Slippage; writer for The New Yorker
 Matt Gribble – Olympic swimmer, 2-time NCAA champion
 Tim Hardaway Jr. – basketball player, shooting guard for Dallas Mavericks
 Sylvia Hitchcock – Miss USA and Miss Universe 1967
 Bill Hurst – former MLB player with Miami Marlins
 Jonathan James – teen hacker who penetrated NASA and DOD computer systems at age 15
 Candy Jernigan – illustrator, graphic designer, avant-garde multimedia artist
 Fiona Kelleghan – writer and editor, chiefly in fields of science fiction, fantasy and mystery fiction
 Debbie Liebling – entertainment executive and film producer
 Ron Magill – wildlife expert and communications director of Zoo Miami
 Roger Manganelli – bassist for Less Than Jake
 Jo Mersa Marley - musician; grandson of Bob Marley
 Rohan Marley – owner of Marley Coffee & Tuff Gong Clothing; son of Bob Marley
 Paul McKinley – dean at Saybrook College, Yale University
 Matt Mehana – vocalist for I Set My Friends On Fire
 Bill Miller – chairman and chief investment officer of Legg Mason Capital Management
 Orson Mobley – former NFL player with the Denver Broncos
 Vivek Murthy – Surgeon General of the United States
 Chris Myers – former NFL player for the Denver Broncos and Houston Texans
 Al Palewicz – former NFL player for the Kansas City Chiefs
 Katie Phang – attorney and television host
 Jennifer Rodriguez – speed skater, world champion and 2-time Olympic bronze medalist
 Wade Rowdon – former MLB player with Cincinnati Reds, Chicago Cubs, and Baltimore Orioles
 Cecil Sapp – former NFL player for the Denver Broncos
 Kimbo Slice – bareknuckle boxer and mixed martial artist
 Dave Williamson – stand-up comedian

See also
Miami-Dade County Public Schools

References

External links
 

Educational institutions established in 1958
Miami-Dade County Public Schools high schools
1958 establishments in Florida